Amigene Metcalfe (born 18 January 1974 in Hamilton, New Zealand) is a New Zealand netball player. Metcalfe played international netball with the Silver Ferns in 2004, and later captained the New Zealand A team in 2005. She also played eight years in the National Bank Cup, and one year in the ANZ Championship as captain for the Waikato Bay of Plenty Magic. Metcalfe resigned from the Magic after one season to spend more time with her family.

In 2021 she resigned as coach for the Waikato Bay of Plenty Magic.

References

External links
 2008 ANZ Championship profile

1974 births
Living people
New Zealand netball players
Waikato Bay of Plenty Magic players
ANZ Championship players
New Zealand international netball players
Waikato Bay of Plenty Magic coaches
National Bank Cup players